State Route 98 (SR 98) is a short state highway in southwestern Maine.  It is a  connection between the city of Saco and Old Orchard Beach between U.S. Route 1 (US 1) and SR 5/SR 9.  SR 98 is signed as an east–west highway although its orientation is more northwest-to-southeast.

Route description
SR 98 begins in Saco at an intersection with US 1.  It proceeds southeast into Old Orchard Beach, passing by the Dunegrass Golf Club before meeting its eastern terminus at SR 5 just short of SR 5's southern terminus at SR 9 on the coastline.  The Old Orchard Beach Town Hall and Inn are located near the intersection of SR 5 and SR 98. SR 98 does not intersect any numbered routes between its endpoints.

History
The route between Saco and Old Orchard Beach was originally designated as SR 6 in 1937.  The SR 6 designation was removed in 1946, when SR 6 was moved to its current routing.  Former SR 6 was then designated as SR 98, and the routing has not changed since.

Major intersections

References

External links

098
Transportation in York County, Maine